Hermann Frenkel (born May 21, 1850, Danzig - died May 26, 1932, Berlin) was a partner of the Jacquier and Securius Bank and after 1923 a partner of Friedrich Minoux, owner of the Wannsee Villa, later the venue of the Wannsee Conference. Frenkel was a Privy Commercial Councillor (Geheimer Kommerzienrat), and one of the founders of Universum Film AG. Frenkel was also a noted art collector, who concentrated on German, French, and Spanish 19th-century paintings, as well as Dutch 17th-century and Venetian 18th-century works. His heirs sold most of the collection in October 1932. Some works were not sold, among them a still-life by Snyders, which today is in the Museum Kunstpalast in Düsseldorf, which was bought in 1938.

References

German bankers
Businesspeople from Berlin
People of the German Empire
People of the Weimar Republic
German art collectors
1850 births
1932 deaths